Maksims Širokovs (born December 13, 1982) is a Latvian professional ice hockey player, who plays defence. He currently plays for the Red Ice of the NLB. He is the younger brother of Aleksejs Širokovs.

Playing career
Širokovs started his professional career with Liepājas Metalurgs of the Latvian Hockey Higher League. He has represented the Latvian national team in various tournaments. He made his debut in the 2015 world championship during a loss against Canada

References

External links

1982 births
Living people
Latvian ice hockey defencemen
Arlan Kokshetau players
Dinamo Riga players
HC Pustertal Wölfe players
HC Red Ice players
HC Sierre players
HK Liepājas Metalurgs players
HK Nitra players
HK Riga 2000 players
HK Zemgale players
Ice hockey people from Riga
Karlskrona HK players
Kazzinc-Torpedo players
HC Neman Grodno players
Prizma Riga players
Wipptal Broncos players
Latvian expatriate sportspeople in the United States
Latvian expatriate sportspeople in Sweden
Latvian expatriate sportspeople in Slovakia
Latvian expatriate sportspeople in Kazakhstan
Latvian expatriate sportspeople in Ukraine
Latvian expatriate sportspeople in Switzerland
Latvian expatriate sportspeople in Italy
Latvian expatriate sportspeople in Belarus
Latvian expatriate sportspeople in Romania
Latvian expatriate sportspeople in Estonia
Expatriate ice hockey players in the United States
Expatriate ice hockey players in Sweden
Expatriate ice hockey players in Slovakia
Expatriate ice hockey players in Kazakhstan
Expatriate ice hockey players in Ukraine
Expatriate ice hockey players in Switzerland
Expatriate ice hockey players in Italy
Expatriate ice hockey players in Belarus
Expatriate ice hockey players in Romania
Expatriate ice hockey players in Estonia
Latvian expatriate ice hockey people